Lloyd Robinson (10 May 1918 – 15 August 1967) was an Australian rules footballer who played with Footscray in the Victorian Football League (VFL).

External links

Notes 

1918 births
1967 deaths
Australian rules footballers from Victoria (Australia)
Western Bulldogs players